Liesbeth Mouha (born 7 January 1983) is a beach volleyball player from Belgium. She is partnered in the 2008 Summer Olympics with Liesbet Van Breedam.

References

External links
 

1983 births
Living people
Beach volleyball players at the 2008 Summer Olympics
Belgian beach volleyball players
Olympic beach volleyball players of Belgium
Women's beach volleyball players